Andrei Derevianko is a Russian-American theoretical physicist. He is Sara Louise Hartman Professor of Physics at the University of Nevada. He was awarded the status of Fellow in the American Physical Society, after he was nominated by their Division of Atomic, Molecular & Optical Physics in 2008, for elucidating the role of the Breit interaction in atomic parity non-conservation, demonstrating the importance of higher-order non-dipole corrections in low-energy photoionization, and for pioneering calculations of higher-order many-body corrections to atomic energies and matrix elements.

Derevianko obtained his M.S. in physics and applied mathematics with summa cum laude honors, from Moscow Institute of Physics and Technology in Moscow, Russia in 1992. In 1996, he got his Ph.D. in physics from Auburn University where he also was a Graduate Research and Teaching Assistant since 1993. Following graduation, Derevianko became a postdoc at the University of Notre Dame in W. R. Johnson group and then served as such at Harvard University under mentorship from Alexander Dalgarno. He joined University of Nevada in 2001 as an assistant professor and since that year was promoted to associate and professor of physics there.

References

External links

20th-century births
Living people
Russian physicists
Moscow Institute of Physics and Technology alumni
Auburn University alumni
University of Nevada, Reno faculty
Fellows of the American Physical Society
Year of birth missing (living people)
Place of birth missing (living people)